Dúlcia Maria Davi (born 18 January 1982), commonly known as Dulce, is a Brazilian professional footballer who plays as a centre back for Série A2 club Real Ariquemes EC.

Career
Dulce was part of the Equatorial Guinea women's national football team at the 2011 FIFA Women's World Cup.

On 5 October 2017, Dulce and other nine Brazilian footballers were declared by FIFA as ineligible to play for Equatorial Guinea.

References

External links

1982 births
Living people
Footballers from São Paulo
Brazilian women's footballers
Women's association football central defenders
Sport Club Corinthians Paulista (women) players
Associação Desportiva Centro Olímpico players
São José Esporte Clube (women) players
São Paulo FC (women) players
Associação Acadêmica e Desportiva Vitória das Tabocas players
Campeonato Brasileiro de Futebol Feminino Série A1 players

Equatorial Guinea women's international footballers
2011 FIFA Women's World Cup players